Audax Groep is a Dutch print media and retail company, active also in Belgium. Its headquarters are located in Gilze. Audax was founded in 1958 by Jacques de Leeuw. Jacques de Leeuw led the company until 2017 when he was replaced by his son, Hubert de Leeuw. In 2019 he was replaced by Casper de Nooijer. In 2020, Hubert de Leeuw took over the lead again. In May 2021 Audax published an intention to sell off the Marskramer, Novy and Prima stores it had acquired in 2019. In August 2021, these were acquired by the toy chain Otto Simon.

Publishing 
Audax Publishing publishes 11 magazines (figure for November 2020). Its most notables titles are HP/De Tijd, Weekend, Party, and Mijn Geheim. Most titles were acquired from the Finnish Sanoma concern. In 2018, Audax sold magazine publisher Cascade to DPG Media, parting from magazines Primo, Eos, Bahamontes, Motoren & Toerisme and For Girls Only. But for Primo, DPG sold these magazines again. Audux Publishing also produces and prints books, calendars, and flyers for other companies and builds websites.

Retail

AKO 
The Algemene Kiosk Onderneming (AKO) is a kiosk/bookstore chain with 72 stores throughout the Netherlands in November 2020. The company was founded in 1878 as the Amsterdamsche Kiosk Onderneming. Many shops are located at railway stations. A typical shop stores 1,500 books and 2000 magazines. Dutch and international newspapers, magazines, and books are sold. The stores also sell basic office supplies, greeting cards, lottery and football pool tickets, gift cards, tobacco products, light beverages, and sweets.

Bruna 

Bruna is a Dutch bookseller. In addition to books it sells newspapers, magazines, stationery, computer software, and cards. In November 2020, Bruna operates 270 shops in the Netherlands. Bruna was founded in 1868. The company was led by Henk Bruna from 1935 to 1982.  ֿIts head office was in Houten until spring 2019, when as a cost-cutting measure it relocated to Amsterdam.

In early 2017, the book chain was in serious financial trouble; its main stockholders came to the rescue in February. In December 2017 the company was acquired by the publisher Veen Bosch & Keuning (VBK). In late 2019, the company was acquired by Audax, the parent company of competing bookseller Algemene Kiosk Onderneming (AKO).

Read Shop 
Read Shop is a network of 170 stores throughout the Netherlands that sell books, magazines, office supplies, tobacco products, and snacks.

References

External links
 Official website 

Bookstores in the Netherlands
Dutch companies established in 1958
Publishing companies of the Netherlands
Retail companies of the Netherlands
Companies based in North Brabant